Excellent Women is a novel by Barbara Pym, first published in 1952, her second published novel and generally acclaimed as the funniest and most successful of her comedies of manners.

Title
The phrase "excellent women" is used by men in reference to the kind of women who perform small but meaningful duties in the service of churches and voluntary organisations. The phrase was first used by Pym in her early unpublished novel Civil to Strangers and is taken from Jane Austen's novel Sanditon.<ref>Cannon, Catriona, Whatever we hereafter write, 'tis thy Posterity''', paper published in Green Leaves: The Journal of the Barbara Pym Society, Autumn 2015, p.5</ref>

Plot summary

The book details the everyday life of its narrator, Mildred Lathbury, a spinster in her thirties in 1950s Britain. Perpetually self-deprecating, but with the sharpest wit, Mildred is a part-time voluntary worker who occupies herself by attending and helping at the local church. Mildred's life grows more exciting with the arrival of new neighbours, anthropologist Helena Napier and her handsome, dashing husband, Rocky – with whom Mildred fancies herself in love.  Through the Napiers, she meets another anthropologist, Everard Bone, and it is with him that Mildred will eventually form a relationship.  A subplot revolves around the activities of the local vicar, Julian Malory, who becomes engaged to a glamorous clergyman's widow, Allegra Gray.  Allegra proceeds to ease out Julian's sister and housekeeper, Winifred, a close friend of Mildred's. Eventually matters come to a head and Allegra leaves the vicarage after a quarrel. In the meantime, Helena, who has been on the verge of leaving Rocky for Everard, accepts that Everard does not care for her and leaves the neighbourhood, along with Rocky.

The novel concludes with Mildred unsure of her future, but having agreed to carry out indexing tasks for Everard Bone. Other Pym novels portray Everard and Mildred as a married couple, usually unseen.

As with most of Pym's books, the plot is less important than the precise drawing of the comic characters (such as Everard's elderly mother who is obsessed with the suppression of woodworm) and situations.

Characters
Mildred Lathbury 
Helena Napier
Rockingham Napier
Julian Malory
Winifred Malory
Everard Bone
Mrs Bone
Allegra Gray
Dora Caldicote (Mildred's old schoolfriend)
William Caldicote (Dora's brother)
Mrs Morris (cleaning lady and confidante)
Miss Jessop (friend of Mrs Bone)
Sister Blatt (member of Julian's congregation)
Other anthropologists

Publication history
Pym completed the novel in February 1951, and it was published by Jonathan Cape in 1952. The book was well-received and has remained one of her greatest successes. The Church Times compared Pym's writing to Jane Austen while John Betjeman reviewed the novel for The Daily Telegraph, writing that "Barbara Pym is a splendidly humorous writer". The novel sold 6,577 copies in Great Britain by the end of the 1950s, far outselling her other early novels, although by no means a bestseller.

By 1954, Pym wrote that eight American publishers and 10 publishers from Continental Europe had seen the manuscript and declined to publish it. Excellent Women was first published in the United States by E.P. Dutton in 1978. The novelist John Updike, reviewing the American release in 1978, wrote that:

The novel was eventually published in France in 1990 as Des Femmes Remarquables, in Spain as Mujeres excelentes, in Italy as Donne eccellenti, and Germany as Vortreffliche Frauen. In 2011, Hachette released the novel as an audiobook read by Jonathan Keeble and Gerry Halligan.

Analysis
The novel has been noted for its accurate analysis of life in post-war England, where rationing was still in effect and everyone had suffered loss of people close to them.

Pym drew on her own life for some elements of the novel. It is the first of many of her novels to feature anthropologists; Pym had worked at the International African Institute in London since 1946. The character of Rockingham Napier has been flag lieutenant to an admiral in Italy where his wife says he 'hasn't had to do anything much but be charming to a lot of dreary Wren officers'; Barbara Pym had been a WRN officer in Italy during World War II.

In a 14 July 1964 letter, having just re-read Excellent Women, the poet Philip Larkin wrote to Pym saying that the novel was "better than I remembered it, full of a harsh kind of suffering [-] it's a study of the pain of being single,- time and again one senses not only that Mildred is suffering but that nobody can see why she shouldn't suffer, like a Victorian cabhorse. " And again in a letter of 1971 he praised the book, - "what a marvellous set of characters it contains! My only criticism is that Mildred is a tiny bit too humble at times, but perhaps she's satirising herself. I never see any Rockys, but almost every young academic wife ('I'm a shit') has something of Helena."

Adaptations
The novel was serialised as a radio play in the 1950s on the BBC Woman's Hour.Excellent Women was serialised in 10 parts on BBC Radio 4's Books at Bedtime programme, read by Deborah Findlay

Connections to other novels
Barbara Pym's characters often reappear or are referenced in later novels. In Jane and Prudence (1953), one of the characters mentions that "nice Miss Lathbury" has married an anthropologist (presumably Everard). In Less than Angels (1955), Everard reappears as a character, described as "having married a rather dull woman who was nevertheless a great help to him in his work; as a clergyman's daughter she naturally got on very well with the missionaries that they were meeting now that they were in Africa again." Later Pym writes "Everard's wife Mildred would do the typing". Bone appears finally in An Unsuitable Attachment in which he attends a dinner party while his wife, Mildred, is at home sick.

This novel also introduces the anthropologist's assistant Esther Clovis, who will feature in the novels Less Than Angels and An Unsuitable Attachment, and whose funeral service will appear from different perspectives in both An Academic Question and A Few Green Leaves. The character of Archdeacon Hoccleve in Excellent Women had previously played a larger role in Pym's first novel, Some Tame Gazelle''.

References

External links 

1952 British novels
Novels by Barbara Pym
Jonathan Cape books